Alipur  is a village in Kapurthala district of Punjab State, India. The village is administrated by a Sarpanch, who is an elected representative.

Demography 
According to the report published by Census India in 2011, Alipur has a total number of 17 houses and population of 110 of which include 57 males and 53 females. Literacy rate of Alipur is 74.47%, lower than state average of 75.84%. The population of children under the age of 6 years is 16 which is 14.55% of total population of Alipur, and child sex ratio is approximately 1667 higher than state average of 846.

Population data

Air travel connectivity 
The closest airport to the village is Sri Guru Ram Dass Jee International Airport.

Villages in Kapurthala

External links
  Villages in Kapurthala
 Kapurthala Villages List

References

Villages in Kapurthala district